Periophthalmodon septemradiatus is a species of mudskipper found along tropical shorelines of the eastern Indian Ocean where it occurs in marine, brackish and fresh waters from India to Indonesia. It is found along in estuaries as well as in the rivers. 

This species inhabits mud banks which are covered by such vegetation as mangroves, nypah palms where the water is of very low salinity, near 0 ppt, in the upper reaches of estuaries and in small tributaries.  It can grow to a length of  TL.  

This species is of no interest to local commercial fisheries. The specific name means "seven rayed" and refers to the seven short rays in this fish's first dorsal fin. 

P. septemradiatus is the only fish known to communicate acoustically while out of water and when they are alarmed they dash towards land rather than water.

References

Mudskippers
septemradiatus
Fish of the Indian Ocean
Fish of the Pacific Ocean
Fish described in 1822
Taxa named by Francis Buchanan-Hamilton